Goodenow, is an unincorporated community in Will County, Illinois, United States.

Demographics

History

First surveyed in 1839,  were purchased in 1853 by George Goodenow. Divided into "blocks, lots, streets and alleys" in 1872. It is in a semi-rural area with the closest town being Crete to the north and Beecher to the south. It is very wooded and contains remnant Oak trees and prairie grass with many houses on large, wooded lots. The major industry was the now-closed Beecher Landfill which took in garbage from the Chicago metropolitan area. Will Township Unity.  To the east of the area is the  Goodenow Grove Nature Preserve. To the south, it is open farmlands for several miles until you get to the town of Beecher. The town lies on the Valparaiso Moraine and the small stream, Plum Creek, runs through the area.

References

Unincorporated communities in Will County, Illinois
Unincorporated communities in Illinois